Austin FC II is an American professional soccer team that is located in Austin, Texas. It is the reserve team of Austin FC and participates in MLS Next Pro.

History 
On August 4, 2022, Austin FC was named as one of seven MLS-affiliated clubs that would field a team in the MLS Next Pro league beginning in the 2023 season. On December 13, 2022, Austin FC announces that the reserve club would be named Austin FC II. The purpose of the team is to develop players to compete at a high level and provide a pathway to becoming a fully professional player for elite soccer players. The goal of the team is to develop these players to potentially move up to the Austin FC first team. Later that day, Austin FC announced that Brett Uttley will be the first coach for Austin FC II. Holding both a UEFA A License and UEFA Elite Youth A License from the Football Association of Wales, Uttley has been an assistant coach at the college, USL Championship and MLS level, most recently as an assistant with Inter Miami CF. The team will consist of players who are on first team contracts with Austin FC, players who Austin FC II sign directly to the team, and Austin FC Academy players. The team will train at the St. David's Performance Center in Austin, TX.

Players and staff

Current roster

Staff
{| class="wikitable"
|-
! style="background:#00AE42; color:#000000;" scope="col" colspan="2"|Executive

|-
! style="background:#00AE42; color:#000000;" scope="col" colspan="2"|Coaching Staff

Statistics and records

Season-by-season

Head coaches record

See also 
 MLS Next Pro

References

External links 
 
 Official Facebook
 Official Twitter

Association football clubs established in 2022
2022 establishments in Texas
Austin FC
Soccer clubs in Texas
Reserve soccer teams in the United States
MLS Next Pro teams